188th Brigade may refer to:

Infantry:

 188th (2/1st Northumberland) Brigade, a second-line Territorial Force formation of the British Army in World War I
 3rd (Royal Marine) Brigade, a formation of the British Royal Marines in World War I renumbered 188th Brigade in 1916
 188th Infantry Brigade (United States), an infantry training formation of the United States Army

Armour:

 188th 'Barak' (Lightning) Armored Brigade of the Israel Defense Forces

Artillery:

 CLXXXVIII Brigade, Royal Field Artillery, a unit of the 40th Infantry Division (United Kingdom) in World War I